Nizhniye Usly (Tübänge Uśılı) is a rural locality (a selo) in Uslinsky Selsoviet, Sterlitamaksky District, Bashkortostan, Russia. The population was 444 as of 2010. There are 2 streets.

Geography 
Nizhniye Usly is located 27 km northwest of Sterlitamak (the district's administrative centre) by road. Verkhniye Usly is the nearest rural locality.

References 

Rural localities in Sterlitamaksky District